Typha capensis is an aquatic plant known from southern and eastern Africa as far north as Uganda. It has also been reported from Brazil.

The rhizomes of Typha capensis are used medicinally in southern Africa. It is reported to improve circulation and to enhance male libido and performance.

References

capensis
Aquatic plants
Flora of Africa
Flora of Brazil
Taxa named by N. E. Brown
Taxa named by Paul Rohrbach (botanist)